Big Time in Hollywood, FL is an American comedy television series created and written by Alex Anfanger and Dan Schimpf.  A 10-episode first season was ordered by the American cable television network Comedy Central, which premiered on March 25, 2015.

Comedy Central made no official cancellation statement; however, on September 25, 2015, series star Lenny Jacobson confirmed that there would not be a second season.

Cast
Alex Anfanger as Jack Dolfe, a delusional self-proclaimed filmmaker
Lenny Jacobson as Ben Dolfe, Jack's brother
Jon Bass as Del Plimpton, Jack and Ben's childlike friend
Kathy Baker as Diana Dolfe, Jack and Ben's mother
Stephen Tobolowsky as Alan Dolfe, Jack and Ben's father

Recurring guests
Cuba Gooding Jr. as himself
Keith David as Agent Everett Malloy
Betsy Sodaro as Darla
Paz Vega as Isabella Delgado
Michael Madsen as Harvey Scoles
Marcus Giamatti as Detective Jim Zdorkin 
Jane Kaczmarek as Dr. Linda Moore
Lee Schall as Ted
Crispin Alapag as Marco Chavez

Episodes

Reception
Big Time in Hollywood, FL received generally positive reviews from critics. On Rotten Tomatoes, the first season has a rating of 73%, based on 11 reviews, with an average rating of 6.8/10. The site's critical consensus reads, "An absorbing narrative and talented cast help Big Time in Hollywood, FL balance its occasionally obnoxious antics with witty slapstick." On Metacritic, the season has a score of 68 out of 100, based on 10 critics, indicating "generally favorable reviews".

References

External links

2010s American black comedy television series
2015 American television series debuts
2015 American television series endings
English-language television shows
Television shows set in Florida
Comedy Central original programming
Television series by Red Hour Productions